Kepçeli is a village in the Genç District, Bingöl Province, Turkey. The village is populated by Kurds of the Ziktî tribe and had a population of 354 in 2021.

The hamlets of Durmuşlu, Eskiköy, İmeceli, Kaledibi, Kayasırtı, Kurucu, Kuyucak, Pınarbaşı and Temelli are attached to the village.

References 

Villages in Genç District
Kurdish settlements in Bingöl Province